Colobogaster is a genus of beetles in the family Buprestidae, containing the following species:

 Colobogaster acostae Rojas, 1856
 Colobogaster amorosa Obenberger, 1952
 Colobogaster anchoralis Obenberger, 1932
 Colobogaster annei Gory, 1841
 Colobogaster apolinari Obenberger, 1932
 Colobogaster aureoviridis Fisher, 1933
 Colobogaster aurora Obenberger, 1952
 Colobogaster belemensis Obenberger, 1952
 Colobogaster bella Kirsch, 1873
 Colobogaster biguttata Kerremans, 1897
 Colobogaster boliviana Obenberger, 1952
 Colobogaster bourgoini Obenberger, 1928
 Colobogaster cayennensis (Herbst, 1801)
 Colobogaster celsa (Erichson, 1848)
 Colobogaster chlorosticta (Klug, 1825)
 Colobogaster croesa Obenberger, 1922
 Colobogaster cupricollis Kerremans, 1897
 Colobogaster cyanitarsis Gory & Laporte, 1837
 Colobogaster decorata Thomson, 1878
 Colobogaster desmarestii Deyrolle, 1862
 Colobogaster diversicolor Thomson, 1879
 Colobogaster diviana Gory, 1841
 Colobogaster ecuadorica Obenberger, 1928
 Colobogaster embrikiella Obenberger, 1936
 Colobogaster empyrea (Gory, 1832)
 Colobogaster equadorica Obenberger, 1928
 Colobogaster eximia Gory, 1841
 Colobogaster geniculata Théry, 1920
 Colobogaster gigas Fisher, 1933
 Colobogaster goryi Obenberger, 1934
 Colobogaster hustachei Théry, 1920
 Colobogaster incisifrons Théry, 1920
 Colobogaster infraviridis Thomson, 1879
 Colobogaster itaitubensis Théry, 1936
 Colobogaster jacquieri Gory, 1841
 Colobogaster lemoulti Théry, 1946
 Colobogaster martinezi Cobos, 1966
 Colobogaster modesta Théry, 1920
 Colobogaster nickerli Obenberger, 1952
 Colobogaster paraensis Kogan, 1965
 Colobogaster peruviana Obenberger, 1924
 Colobogaster pizarroi Cobos, 1966
 Colobogaster puncticollis Waterhouse, 1887
 Colobogaster quadridentata (Fabricius, 1793)
 Colobogaster quadriimpressa Thomson, 1878
 Colobogaster resplendens Gory, 1841
 Colobogaster rotundicollis Obenberger, 1928
 Colobogaster seabrai Kogan, 1965
 Colobogaster seximpressa Théry, 1911
 Colobogaster singularis Gory, 1841
 Colobogaster soror Théry, 1936
 Colobogaster splendida (Lucas, 1858)
 Colobogaster strandi Obenberger, 1928
 Colobogaster sulci Obenberger, 1932
 Colobogaster triloba (Olivier, 1790)
 Colobogaster weingaertneri Hoscheck, 1931
 Colobogaster weyrauchi Cobos, 1966

References

Buprestidae genera